Cheez may refer to:

Cheez (music), compositions in Indian Classical Music
Cheez TV, an Australian children's cartoon show
Cheez, a slang term for cheese

See also
Cheez-It, brand of cheese cracker
Cheezies, brand of cheese curl snack food
Cheese (disambiguation)
Cheesy (disambiguation)